Sid Ali «Alilou» Yahia-Chérif, (born January 4, 1985, in Hydra) is an Algerian football player who is currently playing for RC Kouba.

Club career
Growing up in Algiers, Yahia-Chérif began playing on the streets and in neighborhood tournaments. He played briefly for two local sides: ES Kouba and ES Ben Aknoun. In 2003, at age 18, he signed with the RC Kouba junior team, quickly making his mark at the club, and just two years later, he was promoted to the senior side. In the 2007/2008 season, Yahia-Chérif helped the club win promotion to the top flight. However, they would be relegated the following season with Yahia-Chérif leaving the club at the end of the 2008/2009 season.

JS Kabylie
In the summer of 2009, he was linked with a move to a number of French clubs including AS Monaco, FC Metz, FC Istres and Stade Reims. However, Yahia-Chérif chose to stay close to home, signing a three-year contract with JS Kabylie.

In his first season with the club, he made 31 league appearances, scoring 10 goals, as JS Kabylie finished third in the domestic league. He also played a role in the teams run to the semi-finals of the 2010 CAF Champions League. In the first round of the competition, he scored the only goal in the return leg against Tunisian side Club Africain as JS Kabylie won 1-0 and advanced 2-1 on aggregate.

In his second season, he made just 10 league appearances and failed to find the back of the net. However, on May 1, 2011, he started in the 2011 Algerian Cup Final, as JS Kabylie went on to win 1-0 against USM El Harrach, to win its first Algerian Cup since 1994.

FC Istres
On 6 July 2011, Yahia-Chérif signed a three-year contract with French Ligue 2 side Istres.

International career
On April 17, 2008, he was called up to the Algerian A' National Team for a qualifier against Morocco for the 2009 African Championship of Nations. He was the only player in the squad playing in the second division. He has also been capped for Algeria at the Under-23 level.

Honours
 Won the Algerian Cup once with JS Kabylie in 2011

References

1985 births
Algerian footballers
Living people
Kabyle people
Footballers from Algiers
Algerian Ligue Professionnelle 1 players
Ligue 2 players
Algeria A' international footballers
RC Kouba players
FC Istres players
JS Kabylie players
MC Alger players
JS Saoura players
Expatriate footballers in France
Algeria under-23 international footballers
2011 African Nations Championship players
Algerian expatriate footballers
Association football forwards
21st-century Algerian people